Bennett End is a hamlet near Radnage and Bledlow Ridge in Buckinghamshire, England.  At the 2011 Census the population of the hamlet was included in the civil parish of Lane End.

References

Hamlets in Buckinghamshire